Freddie Records is an American independent record label founded in Corpus Christi, Texas on November 1, 1969, by musician Freddie Martinez. Initially operating as a recording studio and distributor for Martinez, he expanded his roster to include other musicians of Tejano music in fear of his company folding if he no longer was commercially successful. The label began producing albums for Ramon Ayala, Agustin Ramirez, Oscar Martinez, and Joe Bravo. It became commonplace for albums produced by Freddie Records to appear on Billboards Latin albums chart in the state of Texas. Ayala became the company's top-selling act, allowing Freddie Records to be commercially viable throughout the 1970s and 1980s. In 1978, Freddie Records sponsored a concert at Cole Park in Corpus Christi to record Little Joe's Live for Schlitz album. The event was met with protestors who complained of noise violations to the city council who banned future events to be held in the area. The album remained a lucrative live recording for Freddie Records for two decades. With the growing popularity of Tejano music, Freddie Records expanded its base with an additional 6,000 square feet for a second studio and production facility with updated MCI equipment capable of handling cassette tape and 8-track formats, and began averaging two releases per month.

By 1985, Freddie Records was one of the most successful indie music labels in the United States. The label awarded a gold certification to Mazz for selling 500,000 units of their album Straight from the Heart (1989). In November, the label awarded La Sombra with a platinum and gold plaque for their album Good Boys Wear White (1990). Major record companies offered Martinez to buy Freddie Records, citing its immense catalog as their reason. Music critics believed that indie music labels were not capable of competing with major labels, calling this era as the end of the independent music labels. In March 1992, Freddie Records, Sony, and Fonovisa decided to boycott the Tejano Music Awards, after noticing that EMI Latin's artists dominated the 1992 Tejano Music Awards. In July 1994, Martinez unveiled the 2.38-acre multimillion-dollar headquarters of Freddie Records equipped with a recording studio. The headquarters helped Freddie Records to become the largest indie music label in the state of Texas and reported $2 million in sales. Its employees were able to perform most operations in-house including creating artwork, tape manufacturing, packaging, and shipment throughout the United States and Mexico, while CD manufacturing had to be done off-site. At the 1995 Grammy Awards, Ayala and Los Terribles del Norte each received a nomination for Best Mexican-American Album, the first time Freddie Records' artists made the shortlist.

By 1996, Freddie Records had enjoyed three decades of being the top supplier of the biggest names in regional Mexican music. Despite the genre's decline, Freddie Records posted a 14% sales gain for the first quarter of 1997 compared to the same time in 1996. Tejano music journalist, Rene Cabrera of the Corpus Christi Caller-Times, cited Freddie Records' commercial success and its longevity that was done under Martinez's leadership, helped it to become the "premier independent Latin record label". Billboard found Martinez to be conservative when scouting for new acts, the label actively searched for musicians who can appeal to both norteño and Tejano enthusiast. After the Recording Academy created the Grammy Award for Best Tejano Album in 1998, five albums produced under Freddie Records were nominated for the inaugural 1999 ceremony. Dave Ferman of the Corpus Christi Caller-Times hailed Freddie Records as Tejano music's "most successful independent label ever", following the announcement by the Recording Academy.

In 2000, Martinez Sr., his son Martinez .Jr, and Martinez Sr's brother, Lee Martinez, were charged with tax fraud. All three indicted on the charges pleaded innocent of conspiring to defraud the Internal Revenue Service (IRS) of unpaid income tax. In June 2000, the charges were dismissed after prosecutors reviewed the evidence against the three accused. On June 5, 2002, Martinez, Sr. unveiled the newly renovated three-story headquarters building of Freddie Records. The building was designed by Russ Berger and cost $4.5 million to build. The opening ceremony was followed by an all-night celebration from the label's roster as well as the company's Walk of Fame for its artists. In June 2006, Billboard recognized Freddie Records as the top regional Mexican album imprint beating Sony BMG Norte, EMI Televisa, and Fonovisa. On February 14, 2011, Freddie Records filed for bankruptcy, claiming it has $700,000 in debt with $1,200 in assets. In October 2019, the city council of Corpus Christi issued a proclamation announcing a month-long celebration of Freddie Records' 50th anniversary.

History

1969—1979: Creating Freddie Records and first signed acts 
In November 1969, Freddie Martinez founded Freddie Records after he felt that many of the indie labels he worked with were not sufficiently promoting his band the Freddie Martinez Orchestra. His band recorded several albums with indie music labels, with little success. He believed that starting his own company would be the only way he could achieve success. Sometime before founding Freddie Records, Martinez chose Studio B Recording to record a Tejano song and paid under $200 to utilize the studio's equipment. Jim West was the house engineer for the studio when Martinez recorded his song. West previously departed another recording studio after they rejected him and music engineer Mike Taylor's Tejano sound production, citing the studio's lack of understanding of Tejano music. Martinez approached Studio B Recording, which was situated near the Corpus Christi Bay, with $400 (1970 USD), the company accepted his offer in March 1970. Martinez allowed West to remain a music engineer for him, changing the name of the recording studio to Freddie Records. After Martinez bought the company, he installed a new MCI board and updated the technology already installed by Studio B Recording. Martinez invested $15,000 in the studio and carpeted the building to silence unintended sounds from seeping into recordings, as well as adding a singer's booth to avoid overriding instruments. The studio's renovation lasted through the fall of 1972. Despite the initial plan to use the studio solely for Martinez, music journalist Charlie Brite suggested the purchase of Studio B Recording could be a door opener for entertainers in South Texas and rejuvenate the music market in the area. The purchase was hailed as the first bank loan accepted for a music venture in South Texas. Freddie Records survived Hurricane Celia in August 1970, which resulted in a negative outlook for businesses in the area, at that time.

His first recording as the owner of Freddie Records was "Necesito Tu Amor" which became a regional success, this was followed by "Botancito de Carino". Martinez aligned himself with distributors he was acquainted with prior to founding Freddie Records and initiated a cash on delivery policy on distributors who were known to delay payments. Because of his policy, Martinez was referred to as the "golden haired boy" among his contemporaries. Martinez's wife, Joann also helped with the business; she would take orders from distributors and ship them across the country. Martinez's first album under Freddie Records, Te Traiga Estas Flores, ranked on the Latin albums chart for New York compiled by Billboard, a rarity for a Tejano recording. The album also became a gold seller within the Tejano music industry, at a time when achieving gold records was rare. It eventually sold one million copies in the United States and Mexico. By 1974, it was commonplace for albums produced by Freddie Records to rank on the Billboard Latin albums chart for the state of Texas. Albums produced by the company also managed to rank on Billboards Latin album charts in Chicago, Los Angeles, and Miami. Country music singers Sam Neely and Don Williams have utilized Freddie Records for their albums. Writing for Texas Monthly, Joe Nick Patoski noticed that most Tejano artists who became businessmen had failed. Martinez was among those listed by Patoski to have been the select few to have been successful. Fearing that his company could fail if he was no longer commercially viable as a musician, Martinez decided to sign a few acts to Freddie Records including Agustin Ramirez, Oscar Martinez, and Joe Bravo. Ramirez's album was titled Numero Uno Orta Vez so that Martinez's contemporaries would take him seriously. A 1974 Billboard report found Freddie Records to be "highly profitable" during a music report on Tejano music's growth. Martinez's initial plans for Freddie Records included being the most successful studio in South Texas, rival Los Angeles studios, and to stimulate the stagnant music business in Corpus Christi. 

Like most indie music labels in Texas, Freddie Records did not contractualize their recording artists. They instead negotiated a price with musicians they were interested in that was based on their popularity. The label would sell the albums to flea market vendors and mom and pop shops. Artists would also be able to purchase their own albums at a reduced price and would resell them at their concerts. This was a typical practice for Tejano musicians before department stores, such as K-mart and Walmart, began selling Tejano albums. An exception to this practice was reserved for the label's first artist Ramon Ayala, who became the first artist to sign an exclusive contract with Freddie Records in 1973. Ayala became the company's top-selling act, allowing Freddie Records to be commercially viable throughout the 1970s and 1980s. Freddie Records expected their artists to be excellent in the company's return exchange formula. The label insisted that their musicians be self-promoting and required them to be at their best during their concerts if they wanted to be booked again. The label believed that being booked again would be led to more exposure, which in turn will result in bigger record sales, which would then increase audience turnout. This would lead to better wages and more bookings for them by Freddie Records. Following a recession in the United States in the mid-1970s, Martinez had to delay plans on any further developments for his company. Some of these plans included a crossover into English-language music, entering the film production market, and an expansion of Freddie's Studio B with a 16-track acquisition that was being handled by his brother and promotions manager Lee Martinez and West.

In 1976, songwriter Johnny Herrera sued Martinez for $1 million in royalties (1976 USD) alleging that he was not compensated for his works that he provided for the company. On May 1, 1978, Freddie Records sponsored a concert at Cole Park in Corpus Christi. The park's permit was issued to the Johnny Rodriguez Cerebral Palsy Organization that was co-sponsored by KCCT. The city manager, Marvin Townsend, believed the event was instead turned into "a birthday party" for Freddie Records. The concert was recorded by Freddie Records for their artist Little Joe, who marketed it as the first live album to be recorded at a local park and released it under the title Live for Schlitz, for the Schlitz beer company. The album was released on June 18, 1979, and continued to be a lucrative live album for Freddie Records for two decades. The concert was initially expected to bring in 1,000 people but swelled to 10,000 after Martinez promised free records to those in attendance and expanded the roster of bands that were going to play. Residents in the area protested the concert and complained of noise violations to the city council who banned future events to be held in the area. Townsend estimated it cost the city between $2,000 and $2,500 in overtime for police, traffic control, and cleanup crews. Within a few months, Martinez's father, Lisandro (Lee) Martinez, Sr. had died following a long illness, and a few months later, Martinez's house engineer West, had departed to make competitor Hacienda Records. The two labels were the two most influential record labels in the Tejano music market during the 1970s and 1980s. Freddie Records, along with Hacienda, recorded most of the music from major Tejano recording artists who helped shaped the genre during the 20th century. By 1979, Martinez began providing music contracts to his artists. His standard contract included a three-year exclusively with the label, though had two different one-year contracts with an average return in royalties. Freddie Records was averaging around 10-20 demo tapes being sent every week from Tejano music hopefuls. Martinez would press 1,500 singles for a musician he is interested in, 400-450 of those will be sent out to radio stations, while the remainder would be sold to stores. If the single sells 2,000 or if the label receives requests from vendors for more copies, then "it's doing alright". According to Martinez, a successful recording in the Tejano music market is considered to be 20,000 units sold.

1980—1999: Golden age and decline of Tejano music 
In 1980 and 1981, Freddie Records reported that their "sales have been great". Jessie Salcedo, sales and promotion director for the company, reported that most of their sales were in Texas while reporting sales in Arizona, New Mexico, Colorado, Florida, Hawaii, California, and Nevada. The record label also reported sales in Germany, though Salcedo reported that those orders were from the overseas stationed United States Army personnel. Freddie Records' distribution facility, which is referred to as the "Sparkling City Duplicating", had the capacity to make 30,000 cassette tapes a month. The facility was located near Freddie Records' 24-track recording studio and office in Corpus Christi. The Tejano music market in Corpus Christi, Texas was "booming with popularity", which further diversified indie music labels' reach into communities in Arizona, New Mexico, and California. Freddie Records expanded its base with an additional 6,000 square feet for a second studio and production facility with updated MCI equipment capable of handling cassette tape and 8-track formats, and began averaging two releases per month. By 1986, Tejano music began to slow down and the market began to suffer. Salcedo reported underperforming sales for Freddie Records and began actively suing small record stores that were knowingly selling counterfeited albums and imports from Mexican artists in the area. The label reported a slight increase in sales after a few successful court cases were able to shut down some mom-and-pop shops that were found guilty of the practices. Latin music in Texas was often a decade behind the American music industry in development, marketing, and production capabilities. In 1989, and writing for Billboard, Jesus Guterrez noticed the steady climb and popularity of Tejano music in Texas and believed the genre still had a long way to go before attaining any gains.

Lee revealed that 99% of their employees are musicians themselves. Zandra, former secretary for the company from 1978 to 1981, was discovered by Lee after hearing her sing and taped a demo with Freddie Records. Lee was searching for a female backing vocalist for the Spanish-language cover of Johnny Lee's "Lookin' for Love" (1980). The company was planning on releasing an album featuring Texan musicians singing country music songs in Spanish. By 1985, Freddie Records was one of the most successful indie music labels in the United States. Major record labels began entering the Tejano music market in 1985, Little Joe signed with CBS Discos that same year. By 1989, EMI Latin, WEA Latina, Sony, and Fonovisa, began signing Tejano acts. On January 10, 1990, EMI Latin bought Bob Grever's Cara Records, beginning the golden age of Tejano music. Martinez reflected on the era in an interview that he believed the major labels saw the rise of the Tejano music market and wanted to do what the indie music labels were already doing saying that the major labels were "expecting too much too soon". On March 16, 1990, Martinez awarded a gold certification to Mazz for selling 500,000 units of their album Straight from the Heart (1989). In November, the label awarded La Sombra with a platinum and gold plaque for their album Good Boys Wear White (1990). Martinez Sr., began running the company with his son, Freddie Martinez, Jr. after having graduated from the Corpus Christi State University. Martinez Jr., previously worked in the warehouse of the company when he was a child. They worked together and either produced or co-produced albums together for their artists as well as signing acts. Martinez Sr. also hired his other son, John Martinez, who began overseeing the company's publishing business and also produces new acts. Major record companies offered Martinez to buy his label, citing his immense catalog as their reason. Music critics called the era the end of indie music labels, saying that the future of the genre is with the major labels. In November 1991, Martinez opened its subsidiary Freddie Discos Mexico in León, Guanajuato. In March 1992, Freddie Records, Sony, and Fonovisa wrote a letter to the Texas Talent Musicians Association that they would not promote or participate in future Tejano Music Awards after noticing that most of the categories were won by EMI Latin artists at the 1992 Tejano Music Awards. A fourth label, TH-Rodven, joined the company's boycott of the awards by December 1992. Executive director for the program, Rudy Trevino, revealed that the 1992 TMA ballots followed a special survey it conducted in 1991 for possible recommendations on the program's voting process which president of Sony Discos Frank Welzer participated in, as did radio programmers, distributors, and other industry experts.

Fandango USA's album Class Act (1993) received a platinum award from Freddie Records. In July 1994, Martinez unveiled the 2.38-acre multimillion-dollar headquarters of Freddie Records equipped with a recording studio. Freddie Records became the largest indie music label in the state of Texas. Martinez expanded his label's reach with a promotional office in Hollywood and expanded his staff to over 30 employees. The newly built headquarters opened its doors in November 1994. Its employees are able to perform most operations in-house including creating artwork, tape manufacturing, packaging, and shipment throughout the United States and Mexico, while CD manufacturing had to be done off-site. The company reported $2 million (1995 USD) in sales for 1994. Freddie Records began emphasizing newer and younger talent in hopes that they would remain in the market for some time. The company began releasing promotional albums featuring new acts after radio programmers began requesting free and newer material from the label. At the 1995 Grammy Awards, Ayala and Los Terribles del Norte each received a nomination for Best Mexican-American Album, the first time Freddie Records' artists made the shortlist. In May 1995, Jaime y Loos Chamacos received a gold award for Se Cansaron?... Otra and Como Te Llamas Paloma? from Freddie Records, for selling 50,000 units each.

By 1996, Freddie Records had enjoyed three decades of being the top supplier of the biggest names in regional Mexican music. Ayala remained the label's best-selling act. The company's push into videos had been limited due to the associated cost of making "high-quality" videos, and as a result, has been reserved for its best-selling acts fearing that it would not recoup the cost. The company also purchased a plot of land that will unite its office/warehouse/duplication and studios. In a 1997 music report by Billboard, Martinez felt that radio stations were predominately dominated by veteran Tejano musicians. Martinez believed that Tejano music's prosperity relied on new and upcoming Tejano musicians that he called "the lifeblood and the future" of the genre. Despite the genre's decline, Freddie Records posted a 14% sales gain for the first quarter of 1997 compared to the same time in 1996. The label's top-selling acts in 1997 were Ayala, Jaime y Los Chamacos, and Fandango USA. In September 1997, Martinez planned to build a 32-channel "state-of-the-art studio" in South Corpus Christi. That same year, he was inducted into the Tejano Roots Hall of Fame. Tejano music journalist, Rene Cabrera of the Corpus Christi Caller-Times, cited Freddie Records' commercial success and its longevity that was done under Martinez's leadership, which helped it to become the "premier independent Latin record label". In 1998, Freddie Records reported "a prosperous year" as a result of Ayala's En Las Alas de Un Angel, a tribute album to Cornelio Reyna sold 100,000 units. Newly signed band Los Terribles del Norte's album El Ultimo Paso sold 80,000 units. Billboard found Martinez to be conservative when scouting for new acts, the label actively searched for musicians who can appeal to both norteno music and Tejano audiences. After the Recording Academy created the Grammy Award for Best Tejano Album in 1998, five albums produced under Freddie Records were nominated for the inaugural 1999 ceremony. Among the nominees were Martinez's Leyendas y Raices, La Fiebre's Live...En Concierto!, Jaime y Los Chamacos's Fanaticos, Ayala's Casas de Madera, and Los Terribles del Norte Colgado de un Arbol. Dave Ferman of the Corpus Christi Caller-Times hailed Freddie Records as Tejano music's "most successful independent label ever", following the announcement that five albums produced by the company were nominated at the 1999 Grammy Awards. By 1999, Ayala continued to be Freddie Records' top-selling act, selling an average of 100,000 units per studio effort, while Los Terribles del Norte have sold 75,000 units per album.

2000—present: Continued success and lawsuits 

In December 1999, Martinez was indicted by a federal grand jury, alleging that Martinez failed to report sales revenues made by Freddie Records. On January 4, 2000, federal judge Hayden Wilson Head Jr., postponed the trial of Martinez Sr, Martinez Jr, and Lee on tax fraud charges to June 12, after the defense attorney requested one with no objections. All three indicted on the charges pleaded innocent of conspiring to defraud the Internal Revenue Service (IRS) of $99,637 of unpaid income tax from June 1991 to February 1995. The indictment also alleges that the three understated their sales receipts and revenues of $389,446. In June, the charges were dismissed after prosecutors reviewed the evidence against the three accused. With the advancement and popularity of the Internet, Martinez believed that the Internet would be one of the most "far-reaching and cost-effective ways" to promote new artists. Their website included upcoming new releases, music news, message boards, and audio and video archives where visitors can access samples of their artists. Freddie Records entered a joint venture with WEA Latina in 2002 for Ayala's tribute album for Pedro Infante. WEA Latina owns Infante's catalog, after the label's acquisition of Mexico's Peerless Records. Both labels financed the project and marketed the album through a direct-TV campaign. Although both labels worked together prior to 2002, Ayala's tribute album was the first time Freddie Records and WEA Latina shared responsibilities. The labels shipped 100,000 units throughout the United States in its initial production run. Ayala released his 100th album with Freddie Records, El Numero Cien in 2002. On June 5, 2002, Martinez unveiled the newly renovated three-story headquarters building of Freddie Records. The building was designed by Russ Berger and cost $4.5 million to build. The opening ceremony was followed by an all-night celebration from the label's roster as well as the company's Walk of Fame for its artists. Luis Silva, who became the company's marketing director, announced that the label began singing banda music musicians.

After signing a few major artists who were formally from major labels in 2004, Martinez felt that his label had the strongest roster he ever had. Freddie Records dominated the 2004 Tejano Music Awards with their artists being nominated for 12 categories. In 2006, Antologia, a double-disc retrospective 30-track budget series for Freddie Records' artists was released. Initially, the Antologia series was not selling well, and after a promotional campaign from the company was released, sales increased to almost 400,000 units by year's end. Martinez wanted to tap into the catalog music market, after Sony's successful run of its La Historia series. In June 2006, Billboard recognized Freddie Records as the top regional Mexican album imprint beating out Sony BMG Norte, EMI Televisa, and Fonovisa.

In October 2019, the city council of Corpus Christi issued a proclamation announcing a month-long celebration of Freddie Records' 50th anniversary. The company celebrated its 50th anniversary in the Anchor Ballroom at Texas A&M University-Corpus Christi in December 2019.

Roster

Current 
This is a list of artists currently signed to Freddie Records.

Former

See also 
 List of record labels

References

Works cited

External links 
 
 

1969 establishments in Texas
American companies established in 1969
American record labels
Christian record labels
Companies based in Corpus Christi, Texas
Companies that have filed for bankruptcy in the United States
Latin American music record labels
Pop record labels
Record labels based in Texas
Record labels established in 1969